McMillan Township is a civil township of Ontonagon County in the U.S. state of Michigan.  The population was 406 at the 2020 census.

Communities
The community began as a logging camp in 1888 and in 1889 gained a depot named Ewen Station on the Duluth, South Shore and Atlantic Railway (now the Soo Line Railroad). It was named for W. A. Ewen, a treasurer of the  railroad. It also received a Post Office named Ewen Station in 1889, shortened to Ewen in 1894. The Ewen Post Office, ZIP code 49925, serves much of the township area. Bruce Crossing is about 5 miles east on M-28 and Matchwood about 6 miles west.

Geography

Demographics
As of the census of 2000, there were 601 people, 266 households, and 161 families residing in the township.  The population density was 8.5 per square mile (3.3/km2).  There were 363 housing units at an average density of 5.2 per square mile (2.0/km2).  The racial makeup of the township was 97.67% White, 0.50% Native American, 0.33% Asian, 0.17% from other races, and 1.33% from two or more races.  Hispanic or Latino of any race were 0.17% of the population.

There were 266 households, out of which 27.1% had children under the age of 18 living with them, 50.4% were married couples living together, 6.8% had a female householder with no husband present, and 39.1% were non-families.  35.3% of all households were made up of individuals, and 14.7% had someone living alone who was 65 years of age or older.  The average household size was 2.26 and the average family size was 2.91.

In the township the population was spread out, with 22.6% under the age of 18, 5.0% from 18 to 24, 25.3% from 25 to 44, 30.8% from 45 to 64, and 16.3% who were 65 years of age or older.  The median age was 44 years.  For every 100 females, there were 100.3 males.  For every 100 females age 18 and over, there were 105.8 males.

The median income for a household in the township was $28,580, and the median income for a family was $34,688. Males had a median income of $27,917 versus $21,538 for females. The per capita income for the township was $15,486.  About 8.1% of families and 10.1% of the population were below the poverty line, including 14.0% of those under age 18 and 10.3% of those age 65 or over.

References

Townships in Ontonagon County, Michigan
Townships in Michigan